Baltimore railway station was the terminus of the Baltimore Extension Railway in County Cork, Ireland.

History
The station was opened for passenger traffic on 2 May 1893. It consisted of a brick built station building with slate tiled roof and fully surfaced platforms. It was located at the southern terminus of the branch line from Skibbereen and was the most southerly railway station in Ireland.

Regular passenger services were withdrawn on 1 April 1961.

The station building, platform and a semaphore railway signal remained disused but in situ.
The building was used as a sailing school starting from 1969, that school integrated the "Glénans Irish sailing club" in the 80s.
In 2011 these were incorporated into the French "École des Glénans". That club left the building end of 2013, it is disused since.

References

Further reading 
 

Baltimore, County Cork
Disused railway stations in County Cork
Railway stations opened in 1893
Railway stations closed in 1961
1893 establishments in Ireland
1961 disestablishments in Ireland
Railway stations in the Republic of Ireland opened in the 19th century